Raitu is the Telugu word for "farmer".

It may refer to:

 Raithu Bidda, a 1939 Telugu film
 Raitu Coolie Sangham (Andhra Pradesh) (Farmers Labourers League (Andhra Pradesh)) is a revolutionary peasants' movement in the Indian state of Andhra Pradesh

See also
 El Tor, Egypt, formerly called Raithu